Malte Strömwall (born 24 August 1994) is a Swedish professional ice hockey forward who is currently playing for the Chicago Wolves in the American Hockey League (AHL) while under contract to the Carolina Hurricanes in the National Hockey League (NHL).

Playing career
Undrafted, Strömwall played in the 2015–16 season with AIK IF of the Swedish second tier, HockeyAllsvenskan. In recording 42 points in 49 games, he was signed as a free agent to a two-year entry-level contract with the New York Rangers on 17 April 2016.

In his first North American season in 2016–17, Strömwall was assigned by the Rangers to American Hockey League affiliate the Hartford Wolf Pack. In struggling to find his offensive touch, he recorded just 2 goals and 6 points in 44 games. Approaching his final contract year with the Rangers, Strömwall was unable to make an impression within the Rangers organization and was reassigned to start the 2017–18 season with secondary affiliate, the Greenville Swamp Rabbits of the ECHL on 10 October 2017. He recorded 2 points in 2 games with the Swamp Rabbits before he was placed on unconditional waivers by the Rangers in order for mutual release from his contract on 20 October 2017.

On 26 October 2017, Strömwall agreed to play the remainder of the season in Finland, joining KooKoo of the Liiga on a one-year deal.  In April 2018, Strömwall made with KooKoo a one-year extension agreement. In the following 2018–19 season, Strömwall reached a new level to break out offensively, becoming the top scorer and forward of the Liiga, scoring 30 goals recording 57 points in just 52 games.

On 1 May 2019, Strömwall as a free agent left Finland agreeing to a one-year contract with Russian club, HC Sochi of the KHL. In the midst of his second season with Sochi, Strömwall was traded to perennial contending club, SKA Saint Petersburg, and played out the remainder of the 2020–21 campaign with the club.

As a free agent, Strömwall continued his career in the KHL, joining Belarusian club, HC Dinamo Minsk, on 31 August 2021. In the following 2021–22 season, he recorded 19 goals and 32 points in 38 regular-season games with Dinamo Minsk and added 4 points in as many playoff games.

On 15 July 2022, Strömwall made a long awaited return to the NHL, agreeing to a one-year, two-way contract with the Carolina Hurricanes.

Personal life
Both Strömwall's father and step father played professional hockey.

Career statistics

Regular season and playoffs

International

Awards, honors and records

References

External links

1994 births
AIK IF players
Asplöven HC players
Chicago Wolves players
HC Dinamo Minsk players
Greenville Swamp Rabbits players
Hartford Wolf Pack players
HC Sochi players
HV71 players
IF Troja/Ljungby players
KooKoo players
Living people
Luleå HF players
People from Luleå
SKA Saint Petersburg players
Swedish ice hockey right wingers
Tri-City Americans players
Växjö Lakers players
Sportspeople from Norrbotten County